Oliwa is one of the quarter of Gdańsk, Poland.

Oliwa may also refer to:

Krzysztof Oliwa, ice hockey player
Typhoon Oliwa, a 1997 supertyphoon
Oliwa forests, forests in Gdańsk
Oliwa Cathedral, Gdańsk